F1 2017 is a racing video game based on the 2017 Formula One season. It was released for PlayStation 4, Xbox One, and Windows on 25 August. The game includes all of the twenty circuits, twenty drivers and ten teams competing in the season. The macOS version, developed by Feral Interactive, was released simultaneously with the other versions, a first in the series' history. The Linux version, also by Feral Interactive, was released on 2 November. The game featured the initial driver line ups for the 2017 Formula One season; substitute drivers Jenson Button, Antonio Giovinazzi, Pierre Gasly, Brendon Hartley and Paul di Resta, although all driving in FIA Formula One races during the 2017 season, were not included in the game.

Features
The game features in-game commentary from David Croft and Anthony Davidson. The game also features an expanded team management mode, which offers players more control over research and development of car parts. Engine components and gearboxes are subject to wear and will ultimately fail, with players receiving grid penalties for exceeding their quota of components.

The Fédération Internationale de l'Automobile (FIA)—the governing body of international motorsport— supports F1 2017 as a platform for eSports, following similar moves by Formula E and the World Rally Championship. A variety of race formats are available to players after the sport's commercial holders expressed an interest in using gaming to trial potential race formats.

The game also included a competition for players to design their own racing helmets, with the seven winning designs included in the game.

It was the first game to be used in the Formula One eSports Series, which also debuted in 2017.

Reception

The initial reception to the game was positive, with motorsport magazine Autosport praising it for adding depth to all of the features introduced in F1 2016. The Daily Telegraph praised the game for its updates on previous titles, calling it one of Codemasters' best games. IGN was similarly complimentary for being faithful to the details of its subject, while GameSpots review echoed Autosports response. GamesMaster said it was "a superb, technical racer. F1 fans will love the career mode, but be disappointed by the classic content".

The game reached number 2 in the UK PS4 sales chart, behind Uncharted: The Lost Legacy, but topped the XO charts. The PlayStation 4 version sold 7,190 copies in Japan in its debut week, placing it at 11 on the sales charts. It reached number 2 in Australia, and 4 in New Zealand.

Alphr put it at number 6 on their list of the best racing games on PS4 2017. The game was nominated for "Best Racing Game in IGNs Best of 2017 Awards, and for "eSports Game of the Year" at the 2018 SXSW Gaming Awards; and won the award for "Best Racing Game" at The Independent Game Developers' Association Awards 2018.

References 

2017 video games
Codemasters games
Ego (game engine) games
Esports games
F1 (video game series)
Linux games
PlayStation 4 games
PlayStation 4 Pro enhanced games
Racing video games
Video games scored by Mark Knight
Video games set in Australia
Video games set in Austria
Video games set in Azerbaijan
Video games set in Bahrain
Video games set in Belgium
Video games set in Brazil
Video games set in Canada
Video games set in China
Video games set in Hungary
Video games set in Italy
Video games set in Japan
Video games set in Malaysia
Video games set in Mexico
Video games set in Monaco
Video games set in Russia
Video games set in Singapore
Video games set in Spain
Video games set in Texas
Video games set in the United Arab Emirates
Video games set in the United Kingdom
Windows games
Xbox One games
Xbox One X enhanced games
Multiplayer and single-player video games
Video games developed in the United Kingdom
Feral Interactive games